Dmitri Vladimirovich Tumenko (born 4 May 1989) is a former Russian professional football player.

Club career
He played in the Russian Football National League for FC Dynamo Bryansk in 2010.

Personal life
He is the younger brother of footballer Aleksandr Tumenko.

External links
 
 
 

1989 births
Footballers from Moscow
Living people
Russian footballers
Association football midfielders
FC Spartak Moscow players
FC Dynamo Bryansk players
FC Neftekhimik Nizhnekamsk players